Marr is a habitational surname that originates from Marr in Aberdeenshire, Scotland, and from Marr in West Yorkshire, England. Marr also derives from the German name Marro. Variant spellings include Mar and Marre. Notable people with this surname include:

 Alec Marr, Australian environmentalist who served as Executive Director of the Wilderness Society
 Alem Marr (1787—1843), American-born Jacksonian member of the United States House of Representatives from Pennsylvania
 Alfred Marr (1862–1940), Australian cricketer
 Alison Marr (born 1980), American mathematician and mathematics educator
 Andrew Marr (born 1959), Scottish journalist and political commentator
 Barbara La Marr (1896–1926), American actress, cabaret artist and writer
 Carl von Marr (1858–1936), American painter
 Lefty Marr (1862–1912), American professional baseball player
 Sir Charles Marr (1880–1960), Australian politician
 Chris Marr, American state senator from Spokane, Washington
 David Marr (journalist) (born 1947), Australian journalist and author
 David Marr (neuroscientist) (1945–1980), British neuroscientist and psychologist
 David Marr Walker (1835–1920), Canadian lawyer, judge and political figure in Manitoba
 Don H. Marr, American artist
 Dora Maar (1907–1997), French photographer, painter, and poet
 Runt Marr (1891–1981), American baseball figure
 David G. Marr (born 1937), American/Australian historian specializing in the modern history of Vietnam
 Frances Harrison Marr (1835–1918), American poet
 George Marr Flemington Gillon, MBE (born 1942), English councilman of the City of London Corporation
 George Washington Lent Marr (1779–1856), American politician 
 Hank Marr (1927–2004), American jazz musician
 Hans Marr (1878–1949), German actor
 Hans Marr (ski jumper) (1914–1942), German ski jumper
 Jack Marr (1928–2002), Australian rules footballer
 James Marr Brydone (1779–1866), Scottish surgeon 
 James Marr (author) (1918–2009),  Guernsey historian
 Jason Marr (born 1989), Scottish professional football player in the role of defender
 James William Slessor Marr (1902–1965), Scottish marine biologist and explorer
 Jerzy Marr (1901–1962), Polish film actor
 Jim Marr, the former bass guitarist of the 1980s British pop/rock band Skin Games
 Jodi Marr, American songwriter and producer
 Joe Marr (1880–?), Australian rules footballer 
 John Quincy Marr (1825–1861), American Civil War soldier
 Johnny Marr (born 1963), English guitarist, keyboardist and singer, and member of The Smiths
 Leon Marr (1948–2019), Canadian film and television director and screenwriter
 Leslie Marr, 2nd Baronet (born 1922), British landscape artist, painter and former racing driver
 Marr Phillips (1857–1928), American professional baseball player
 Melissa Marr (born 1972), American author
 Nikolai Marr (1865–1934), Russian historian and linguist
 Nile Marr (born 1992), English musician
 Phebe Marr (born 1931), American historian of modern Iraq with the Middle East Institute
 Reginald Joseph Marr, DFC, OAM, QC (1917–1999), Australian lawyer and military officer
 Reuben Marr (1884–1961), English professional association football player 
 Robert Marr, English professional footballer who played as an inside forward
 Robert Hardin Marr (1819–1892), Louisiana Supreme Court Justice
 Ruairidh Erskine of Marr (1869–1960), Scottish nationalist and aristocrat 
 Sally Marr (1906–1997), American stand-up comic, dancer, actress and talent spotter 
 Scott Marr, American lacrosse coach
 Souk El Marr, one of the souks of Tuni
 Thomas Marr (1866–1936), American architect
 Tom Marr (1942–2016), American talk radio host on WCBM in Baltimore
 Walter Lorenzo Marr (1865–1941), American automotive engineer
 Wilhelm Marr (1819–1904), German agitator and publicist
 William Marr (born 1936), American retired engineering researcher and poet
 Zoë Coombs Marr, Australian comedian, performer and actor
 Carl von Marr (1858–1936), American-born German painter

Characters
 Kila Marr, Star Trek character
 Visas Marr, Star Wars character

See also 
 Bill Marr (disambiguation)
 David Marr (disambiguation)
 John Marr (disambiguation)
 Marra (surname)
 Marre (surname)

References

English-language surnames
German-language surnames
Scottish toponymic surnames